Solomon Rose, known professionally as Silkie, is a English dubstep and grime record producer and DJ from Hammersmith, West London.

Biography
Having first produced UK garage and grime tracks in the early 2000s, Silkie came to prominence a few years later when he linked up with Antisocial Entertainment, who had started a show on Rinse FM.

From there, he began to put out dubstep tracks on Antisocial as well as Deep Medi Musik. In 2009, he released his first album, City Limits Volume 1, which attracted positive reviews from Pitchfork. This was followed up shortly after by City Limits Volume 2 in 2011. Alongside several other EPs, he released a third album, Fractals, in 2015, and a fourth, Panorama, in 2021.

Discography

Albums
 City Limits Volume 1 (Deep Medi, 2009)
 City Limits Volume 2 (Deep Medi, 2011)
 Fractals (Anarchostar, 2015)
 Panorama (Deep Medi, 2021)

Compilations/mixes
 Various (with Quest) - Dubstep Allstars Vol 9 (Tempa, 2012)

Selected singles/EPs
 "Illegal Immigrant / Step Aside" (Antisocial, 2006)
 "Slow Jam" (Deep Medi, 2010)

References

External links

Dubstep musicians
English record producers
DJs from London
Living people
Date of birth missing (living people)
People from Hammersmith
Year of birth missing (living people)
Grime music artists